The 2002 Italian Figure Skating Championships was held from December 7 through December 9, 2001 in Collalbo for the singles and pairs competition. The ice dancing competition was held from December 22 through 23, 2001. Skaters competed in the disciplines of men's singles, ladies' singles, and ice dancing. The results were used to choose the teams to the 2002 Winter Olympics, the 2002 World Championships, the 2002 European Championships, and the 2002 World Junior Championships.

Senior results

Men

Ladies

Pairs

Ice dancing

External links
 results

Italian Figure Skating Championships
2001 in figure skating
Italian Figure Skating Championships, 2002
Italian Figure Skating Championships, 2002